Cody Thomas Webster (born June 1, 1991) is a former American football punter for the Brooklyn Bolts of the Fall Experimental Football League (FXFL). He holds the Purdue single-game punting yard average record. He was the 2013 Big Ten Punter of the Year.

High school career
He started for the varsity football team at Central Dauphin East High School at punter, placekicker, defensive back, quarterback and wide receiver. He was a four-time first team All-Mid Penn Conference punter, and a three-time all-state selection. Webster committed to Purdue on October 4, 2009. Once he committed, he was projected to be the most likely Boilermaker to be a true freshman starter, because starting punter Chris Summers was graduating. He signed his National Letter of Intent with Purdue on February 3, 2010. Upon graduating, he was considered to be the twenty-fifth best placekicker in the national high school class of 2010 by Rivals.com and the thirty-fourth best kicker by ESPN.

College career
Webster played college football for the Purdue Boilermakers where he majored in agriculture. During the 2010, 2011, 2012 and 2013 seasons he was the Boilermakers first team punter. When Webster kicked a 79-yard punt for the 2010 Purdue team against Northwestern, it was the longest punt of his career. In 2010, although true freshman Webster placed fifth in the conference in overall punting average (43.3 yards/punt). He earned honorable mention All-Big Ten honors during the 2010 and 2012 seasons, while also earning first-team All-Big Ten honors in 2013 and second-team All-Big Ten honors in 2011. Webster lead the Big Ten in punting average as a senior.

He was the 2013 Big Ten Punter of the Year. He was named as Ray Guy Award finalist on November 25, 2013.

Professional career
After going undrafted in the 2014 NFL Draft, Webster attended the Pittsburgh Steelers rookie minicamp on a tryout. 

In 2015, he signed with the Brooklyn Bolts of the Fall Experimental Football League (FXFL).

References

External links
 
 Purdue profile

1991 births
Living people
American football punters
Purdue Boilermakers football players
Purdue Boilermakers baseball players
Brooklyn Bolts players
Players of American football from Harrisburg, Pennsylvania
Baseball players from Harrisburg, Pennsylvania